Charlotte Francis (birth name Charlotte Frances Jiggens born 1904) was an English actress best known for playing the lead role in the Australian film The Silence of Dean Maitland (1934) in which she appeared opposite her husband John Longden. She was touring Australia in a company led by Athene Seyler and Nicholas Hannen for J.C. Williamsons in 1933 when cast in the role. She also had extensive stage credits. Her British stage name was Jean Jay.

In 1948 she married journalist and Liberal politician John Hope. She later became a playwright and wrote Western Wind (1949), which was performed at London's Theatre Royal, E15 and Piccadilly theatres. The play had premiered in Glasgow, starring Australian actor, John McCallum and also had a run in Melbourne, Australia.

Frances died in London on 8 February 1983.

Filmography
As actress:
Ordeal by Golf (1924) Millicent Boyd
The Only Way (1926) Jeanne Defarge
Every Mother's Son (1926) Janet Shaw
Afterwards (1928) Hilda Ryder
The Silver King (1929) Nellie Denver
The Third Eye (1929) Flash Annie
The Silence of Dean Maitland (1934) Alma Lee

As writer:
Palais de Danse (1929) story, adapted by John Longden
The School for Scandal (1931) script adapted from Richard Brinsley Sheridan's play
Come into my Parlour (1932) script co-written with John Longden

Select theatre credits
Private Lives (1933)

References

External links

20th-century English actresses
1904 births
1983 deaths
English film actresses
English stage actresses